Gutenstein is a market town in Wiener Neustadt-Land in the Austrian state of Lower Austria.

Population

References 

Cities and towns in Wiener Neustadt-Land District